Electric Blues may refer to:

Electric blues, any type of blues music distinguished by the use of electric amplification
"Electric Blues", a song from the musical Hair
"Electric Blues", a 1991 song by The Soup Dragons

See also
 Electric blue (disambiguation)